is a Japanese anime television series. It was produced by NAS and aired on TV Tokyo for twenty-six episodes. Enoki Films licensed the series as Forza! Mario, and NAS refers to the series by that name on its English website. The series, about a boy who wants to play soccer, aired in 2002, the year of the FIFA World Cup in Japan and Korea.

Jonathan Clements and Helen McCarthy, the authors of The Anime Encyclopedia, Revised & Expanded Edition: A Guide to Japanese Animation Since 1917, wrote that the series "seems far out of its time in the early 21st century" but "the very young audience sees" the sports tropes "with fresh eyes."

Hidemaru appeared on the website nakata.net, Hidetoshi Nakata's official website.

Characters
Clements and McCarthy stated that the cast consists of "wacky animals in sports getup" with a fox, two fat hippopotamus girls, dogs, horses, and rabbits.
 Hidemaru (ひでまる) / Mario - The main character, Hidemaru is a dog. His voice actress is Mayumi Asano.
 Sen-no-Joe (千の丞 Sen no Jō) - An old man who gives advice to Hidemaru on how to play the game. He had previously coached a team but lost the enthusiasm after the end of that team. His voice actor is Masaharu Satō.
 Nana (ナナ) - Sen-no-Joe's granddaughter. Enoki Films described her as the "Madonna of the team." Her voice actress is Sakura Nogawa.
 Rey (レイ Rei) - The team's cheerleader. Her voice actress is Masa Kimura (木村 美佐 Kimura Masa).
 Joe (ジョー Jō) - Described by Enoki Films as a "‘cool' and affected sportsman." His voice actor is Daisuke Kishio.
 Kaizer (カイザー Kaizā) - The son of the owner of Club No. 1 (クラブNO.1 Kurabu No. 1) and the captain of that club. His voice actor is Kentarō Itō.
 Riki (リキ)
 Miki (ミキ) and Mika (ミカ) - Two hippo girls
 Flora (フローラ Furōra) - A rich wolf girl who is madly in love with Joe, and finances the team in order to be allowed to join as a cheerleader.
 Jūbei (十兵衛)
 Kiyoshirō (清四郎)
 Gengorō (源五郎) and Hanjirō (半次郎)
 Ranmaru (蘭丸)
 Kyūtarō (キュータロウ)
 Dorufu (ドルフ)
 Inokuma (イノクマ)
 Kakunoshin (角の進)
 Kintarō (金太郎)
 Bison (バイソン Baison)
 Yanosuke (八の助) and Kunosuke (九の助)

References

External links
  Forza! Hidemaru official website
  Forza! Hidemaru - TV Tokyo
 Forza! Mario - Enoki Films
 
  フォルツァ！ひでまる - Nihon Ad Systems

2002 anime
Association football in anime and manga
Gallop (studio)
Shogakukan manga
TV Tokyo original programming
Animated television series about dogs